Hugh Wagstaff (15 October 1895 – 2 March 1970) was an English cricketer. He played for Essex between 1920 and 1921.

References

External links

1895 births
1970 deaths
English cricketers
Essex cricketers
People from Romford